Hans Beilhack (18 February 1897 — 1 January 1970) was a German librarian. On , Franz Kafka read In the Penal Colony at Hans Goltz's Kunstsalon  in Munich. Two days later, a recension of Beilhack was published in the Münchner Zeitung. In 1936, due to a satirical contribution published in Der Querschnitt, the Nazi regime prohibited Beilhack from writing. In 1945, he became a literature consultant to the Library of Congress Mission to Europe.

Works 
1934: Michael August Schichtl In Der Querschnitt
1935: Aus dem Irrgarten der Bibliographie; In: Börsenblatt für den deutschen Buchhandel Bd. 102.
6 June 1935: Berufsständische Probleme des 17. und 18.Jahrhundert, Die Kunstkammer / Illustrierte Monatszeitschrift mit amtlichen Mitteilungen
1936: Attisches Salz. Witz und Bosheit im Altertum
1936: Bibliotherapie. Bücher als Medizin. In: Deutsche Medizinische Wochenschrift.
1936: Antonio Magliabechi,
: Der Mann, der das Gesicht Münchens veränderte, in:  Nr. 18 vom 18.1.1938, S. 125
: The Library of a Dilettante, A Glimpse into the Private Library of Herr Hitler in Süddeutsche Zeitung,
Künstler über Künstler
1948: Die Frau im Spiegel der Satire
1948: Schiller als Arzt
1948: Verrückte Literaturgeschichte
: München und Umbebung Reiseführer Oberbayern II Uberarbeitung, durchgeführt von Hans Beilhack. Grieben

Footnotes 

1897 births
1970 deaths
German librarians
Writers from Munich